is an action-strategy video game developed by Entersphere and released by Square Enix for the PlayStation Vita.

Gameplay
It includes a multiplayer option. 1-4 players have the ability to play.

Release 
Army Corps of Hell was released on 22 February 2012. It was developed by Enterphere.

Reception 

Reviews were mixed and skewed towards negative ratings, with an average score of 4.50/10 on Game Informer and 57/100 on Metacritic. Tom McShea of GameSpot gave it a rating of 6.5/10, saying "Army Corps of Hell captures the devilish combat of its setting but is too repetitive to sustain that appeal."

References

External links 
 

2011 video games
PlayStation Vita games
Square Enix games
Strategy video games
PlayStation Vita-only games
Video games developed in Japan